In enzymology, a thiosulfate dehydrogenase (quinone) is an enzyme that catalyzes the chemical reaction

2 thiosulfate + 2 6-decylubiquinone  tetrathionate + 2 6-decylubiquinol

Thus, the two substrates of this enzyme are thiosulfate and 6-decylubiquinone, whereas its two products are tetrathionate and 6-decylubiquinol.

This enzyme belongs to the family of oxidoreductases, specifically those acting on a sulfur group of donors with a quinone or similar compound as acceptor.  The systematic name of this enzyme class is thiosulfate:6-decylubiquinone oxidoreductase. Other names in common use include thiosulfate:quinone oxidoreductase, thiosulphate:quinone oxidoreductase, thiosulfate oxidoreductase, tetrathionate-forming, and TQO.

References

 

EC 1.8.5
Enzymes of unknown structure